Mel Barham is a British television reporter employed by ITV Granada.

Career and education 
Barham graduated from Keele University with first-class honours in English and Music, and later completed a postgraduate degree in broadcast journalism at the City University of London. Her journalism career began in radio; she worked for Eagle Radio, Kestrel FM, and later as deputy news editor at Free Radio Birmingham. She joined ITV Granada Reports as an ITV trainee in 2007, and has since become a correspondent and presenter.

Awards 
Barham's ITV Granada Reports team won a BAFTA award in 2013 for coverage of the Hillsborough disaster. Her report on the murder of Lee Rigby was also part of a special by Granada Reports that was nominated for a BAFTA award the following year. In 2013, ITV named her Journalist of the Year.

References

External links 
 BAFTA Television Awards Winners in 2014: News Coverage at the British Academy of Film and Television Arts

Year of birth missing (living people)
Living people
Alumni of Keele University
British television newsreaders and news presenters